Parry Sound was an electoral riding in Ontario, Canada. It was created in 1886 when the riding of Muskoka and Parry Sound was split two ridings: Muskoka and Parry Sound. It was abolished in 1999 when it was merged into the riding of Parry Sound—Muskoka.

Members of Provincial Parliament

References

Former provincial electoral districts of Ontario